Pamela Goldsmith-Jones (born 1961) is a Canadian politician. A member of the Liberal Party of Canada, she served as the Member of Parliament (MP) for West Vancouver—Sunshine Coast—Sea to Sky Country from 2015 to 2019. Previously, she was Mayor of West Vancouver, British Columbia, from 2005 to 2011.

Career 
Goldsmith-Jones attended École Pauline Johnson Elementary School and West Vancouver Secondary School. She attended the University of British Columbia (BA, 1983; MA 1988) where she studied Political Science. She was elected over incumbent Ron Wood on November 19, 2005, and re-elected in 2008. She retired from municipal politics in December 2011, declining to run for a third term.

Goldsmith-Jones completed her executive MBA at Simon Fraser University's Beedie School of Business and ran a consulting firm from 2012–2015. During her career, Goldsmith-Jones also helped with a number of initiatives in British Columbia. Some of these included a call for an end to open-penned salmon farming, and a transition to closed containment instead. Other bills and initiatives she worked on included the second national plan for Women, Peace, and Security in 2017 as well as carbon emission reduction initiatives.

Politics
In 2014, Goldsmith-Jones announced her intention to challenge incumbent West Vancouver—Sunshine Coast—Sea to Sky Country MP John Weston in the 2015 federal election. Goldsmith-Jones won the Liberal Party of Canada nomination in June 2014.  She unseated Weston the following October, winning the election.

On August 31, 2018, she was appointed Parliamentary Secretary to the Minister of Foreign Affairs (Consular Affairs). She has also served as Parliamentary Secretary to the Minister of International Trade Diversification and to the Minister of Foreign Affairs. In 2019, she did not aid in or sponsor any bills in the House of Commons.

As of May 2019, Goldsmith-Jones announced her retirement from federal politics, opting not to run for re-election in 2019. In the 2019 Canadian federal election she was replaced by Liberal MP Patrick Weiler.

Electoral record

References

External links
 Liberal Party of Canada Bio - Pamela Goldsmith-Jones

1961 births
Living people
Mayors of places in British Columbia
People from West Vancouver
Women mayors of places in British Columbia
Liberal Party of Canada MPs
Members of the House of Commons of Canada from British Columbia
Women members of the House of Commons of Canada
21st-century Canadian politicians
21st-century Canadian women politicians